Justice Hubbard may refer to:

Samuel Hubbard (Massachusetts judge) (1785–1847), associate justice of the Massachusetts Supreme Judicial Court
Jonathan Hatch Hubbard (1768–1849), associate justice of the Vermont Supreme Court
Leverett Hubbard (1723–1793), associate justice of the New Hampshire Supreme Court
Nathaniel Hubbard (1680–1748), associate justice of the Massachusetts Supreme Judicial Court